Crystal Falls is a city and the county seat of Iron County, Michigan. As of the 2010 census, the city population was 1,469. The city is located within Crystal Falls Township, but is a separate municipal entity. The area first developed as a major center for iron mining and the timber industry; it has become increasingly popular for tourism in recent years.

History
Crystal Falls was platted in 1881. It was named for a nearby icy waterfall on the Paint River. A post office called Crystal Falls has been in operation since 1885.

Geography

The city is very hilly and the castle-like county courthouse (built in 1890) sits on the highest point, overlooking the downtown business district.

Transportation

Indian Trails provides daily intercity bus service between St. Ignace and Ironwood, Michigan.

Climate

The following precipitation extremes, based on the time period of this station's published record, are:  greatest observation-day total, 3.86 inches, recorded June 14, 1981; greatest monthly
total, 12.48 inches, recorded June 1981; and least monthly total, 0.00 inches, recorded on several occasions.

Summer precipitation comes mainly in the form of afternoon showers and thundershowers.  Annually, thunderstorms will occur on an average of 33 days. There are normally 139.2 days with measurable precipitation.

During this period, 143 days per season averaged  or more of snow on the ground, but varied greatly from season to season.

The following snowfall extremes, based on the time period of this station's published record, are: greatest observation-day total, 18.0 inches, recorded March 7, 1926; greatest monthly total, 53.4 inches, recorded March 1939; greatest seasonal total, 143.2 inches, recorded during 1942–43; least seasonal total, 31.6 inches, recorded during 1963-64 and 1 earlier season; and greatest snowdepth, 47 inches, recorded March 15, 1926.

Although there are no longer official temperature observations in Crystal Falls, Michigan State University concluded that temperatures are similar to those at the National Weather Service office in Marquette, Michigan.  Temperature records kept from 1962 to 1989 by the National Climatic Data Center show a record high of 99 degrees on June 30, 1963, and July 20, 1977.  The record low was -42 degrees on February 17, 1979.  Annually, there were an average of 4.4 days with highs of 90 degrees or higher; 96.9 days with highs of 32 degrees or lower; 207.1 days with lows of 32 degrees or lower; and 55.1 days with lows of 0 degrees or lower.  Freezing temperatures were recorded in every month except July, which had a record low of 33 degrees on July 6, 1965.

Demographics

2010 census
At the 2010 census there were 1,469 people in 700 households, including 402 families, in the city. The racial makup of the city was 96.9% White, 0.2% African American, 0.7% Native American, 0.2% Asian, 0.1% from other races, and 1.8% from two or more races. Hispanic or Latino residents of any race were 1.0%.

Of the 700 households 22.3% had children under the age of 18 living with them, 41.9% were married couples living together, 11.0% had a female householder with no husband present, 4.6% had a male householder with no wife present, and 42.6% were non-families. 39.6% of households were one person and 20.2% were one person aged 65 or older. The average household size was 2.06 and the average family size was 2.73.

The median age was 48.3 years. 19.7% of residents were under the age of 18; 6.4% were between the ages of 18 and 24; 19.3% were from 25 to 44; 32.1% were from 45 to 64; and 22.5% were 65 or older. The gender makeup of the city was 49.4% male and 50.6% female.

2000 census
At the 2000 census there were 1,791 people in 795 households, including 470 families, in the city. The racial makup of the city was 98.05% White, 0.06% African American, 0.61% Native American, 0.11% Asian, 0.39% from other races, and 0.78% from two or more races. Hispanic or Latino of any race were 1.23%. 17.1% were of Finnish, 15.5% Italian, 11.5% German, 9.4% Polish, 9.4% Swedish, 6.6% English and 5.3% French ancestry according to Census 2000. 97.5% spoke English, 1.1% Finnish and 1.1% Spanish as their first language.

Of the 795 households 24.8% had children under the age of 18 living with them, 46.0% were married couples living together, 9.4% had a female householder with no husband present, and 40.8% were non-families. 36.9% of households were one person and 22.3% were one person aged 65 or older.  The average household size was 2.13 and the average family size was 2.78.

The age distribution was 22.2% under the age of 18, 6.1% from 18 to 24, 21.7% from 25 to 44, 21.3% from 45 to 64, and 28.7% 65 or older.  The median age was 45 years. For every 100 females, there were 90.1 males.  For every 100 females age 18 and over, there were 82.8 males.

The median household income was $26,637 and the median family income  was $35,000. Males had a median income of $28,266 versus $20,144 for females. The per capita income for the city was $14,538.  About 7.5% of families and 10.4% of the population were below the poverty line, including 15.6% of those under age 18 and 6.8% of those age 65 or over.

Arts and culture
Crystal Falls is home to the Crystal Theater, a regional performing arts center.

Crystal Falls used to have a high veteran population. After both World Wars, a lot of veterans settled in and around the area. Crystal Falls was the last town to still celebrate V-J Day until the early 2000s. They have two big festivals during the summer. A “bass” festival which is a weekend of fun activity and a marathon. Highlighted by the annual “WOPS” vs Sweeds softball game, the mushroom festival replaced the V-J Day celebrations and that has the  Polack vs Finns softball game.

Head to the ice the last weekend in February on the Michigamme reservoir for the annual Fisheree tournament.  A tradition that most locals look forward to all year.

In April 1992, Crystal Falls received international attention due to the discovery of a giant fungus, Armillaria bulbosa, in the nearby forest. The discovery was announced in articles in Nature and The New York Times. At the time it was believed to be one of the oldest living organism on earth, as well as one of the largest.

Although the fungus is actually located in nearby Mastodon Township, Michigan, the city of Crystal Falls adopted it as a tourist attraction, and holds a "Humungous Fungus Fest" as an annual event.

Images

References

External links

 City of Crystal Falls web site
 Aviva Directory: Crystal Falls
 The Humongous Fungus--Ten Years Later

Cities in Iron County, Michigan
County seats in Michigan
1880 establishments in Michigan
Populated places established in 1880